The 1911–12 season was Chelsea Football Club's seventh competitive season and seventh year in existence. The club finished 2nd in the Second Division and gained promotion back to the First Division.

Table

References

External links
 1911–12 season at stamford-bridge.com

1911–12
English football clubs 1911–12 season